Mauricio Navarro (born April 7, 1966) is a Canadian soccer referee. Navarro was born in Chile but later moved to Vancouver, British Columbia, Canada and became a Canadian citizen.  He attained his FIFA badge in 2000 and went on to become one of Canada's most successful referees before retiring and the end of 2011, having reached the mandatory retirement age.

Career 

After just one year on the FIFA list, Navarro was appointed to the 2001 Copa America, hosted in Colombia.  He officiated just one match, the Group C opener between Bolivia and Uruguay, which Bolivia won 1-0.  Navarro later described this match as one of the most difficult of his career.

Navarro's next major appointment was to the 2003 Gold Cup, where he officiated three matches, one in the group stage, a Quarter-final, and then the Final.

2003 Gold Cup Final
At his retirement, Navarro describes the 2003 Gold Cup final between Mexico, and reigning World Champions Brazil, as the pinnacle of his career.  He had officiated both teams already in the tournament; Brazil in the Group Stage and Mexico in the Quarter-finals.

In 2007, Navarro was appointed to the Gold Cup, where he refereed the Group Stage match between Panama and Honduras and the Quarter-Final match between Honduras and Guadeloupe. The same year he was selected to work the 2007 FIFA U-20 World Cup, which was hosted in Canada.  Unfortunately, due to injury he did not referee any matches, instead only acting as a 4th Official

2008 CONCACAF Champions Cup Final
Navarro was selected, along with Canadian Assistant Referees Hector Vergara and Joe Fletcher to officiate the decisive second leg of the 2008 CONCACAF Champions Cup.  For Navarro, this came after three successive semi-final appointments in the past three years of the tournament. This was the final match ever of the tournament, as beginning the following season it was replaced with the current CONCACAF Champions League.

Final International Match
Navarro's final international appointment came on November 15, 2011 when he officiated the reigning World Champions Spain and Costa Rica.  The initial plan was for Hector Vergara to work the match too, so the friends Navarro and Vergara could officiate their final match together, but Vergara had work commitments and was unable to accept the game.

International Competitions Officiated 
2014 FIFA World Cup Qualification
CONCACAF Champions League
2010 FIFA World Cup Qualification
CONCACAF Champions Cup
2007 FIFA U-20 World Cup
2007 CONCACAF Gold Cup
2006 FIFA World Cup Qualification
2005 CONCACAF Gold Cup
2003 CONCACAF Gold Cup
2002 FIFA World Cup Qualification
2001 Copa America

Personal life 
Navarro was born in Chile. He later moved to Canada, and has two daughters.

References 

Canadian soccer referees
Chilean emigrants to Canada
Naturalized citizens of Canada
1966 births
Living people
Copa América referees
CONCACAF Gold Cup referees
CONCACAF Champions League referees
Major League Soccer referees